Wok with Yan was a Chinese cuisine cooking show starring Stephen Yan. The show was first produced in Vancouver, British Columbia by CTV affiliate CHAN-DT in the late 1970s, before moving to CBC in 1980  (but shot at CJOH) and continuing there until 1982. 

The show then moved into syndication, running until 1995 in that format.

Later sources have occasionally confused the show with Yan Can Cook, an American series hosted by Martin Yan which also aired during the 1980s.

Format
A running gag featured on the show was Yan's wearing of an apron featuring a different pun on the word "wok." Some examples are:

Wok & Roll
Wokking My Baby Back Home
Danger, Yan at Wok
Wok Around the Clock
Wok the Heck
You Are Wok You Eat
Wok Goes up Must Come Down
Wok's New, Pussycat?
Wokkey Night in Canada
Stuck Between a Wok and a Hard Place
Raiders of The Lost Wok
Eat Your Wok Out
Moon Wok
Wok Your Butts Off
Jailhouse Wok
Superior Wokmanship
Wok-A-Doodle-Doo
Wok Before You Run
Wok Me Amadeus
Wok up Little Susie
Wok Don't Run
Don't Wok The Boat
101 Ways to Wok the Dog
The humorous aprons also complemented his humour that consisted of spontaneous one-liners spoken with his trademark Cantonese accent or him playing with his food or cookware. That, combined with his energetic personality, endeared him to Canadian viewers. Prior to him preparing his stir fry cuisine, the show usually featured a vignette of Yan travelling to different vacation spots from around the world (e.g., Thailand). He always invited an audience member to come up and eat with him near the end of each episode (there was a ticket draw in the studio audience to sit with him), and had a fortune cookie  reading before the meal (first done in Cantonese, then translated in English).

References

External links
IMDB.com page
TVarchive.ca page

1978 Canadian television series debuts
1995 Canadian television series endings
CBC Television original programming
Television shows filmed in Vancouver
1970s Canadian cooking television series
1980s Canadian cooking television series
1990s Canadian cooking television series